Hexagon Productions was an Australian film production company established in 1972 by Roadshow Distributors with Tim Burstall and Associates and the company Bilcock and Copping. All parties had successfully collaborated on Stork (1971) and wanted to engage in further production. The company was owned along the following lines:
Burstall - 25%
Bilcock and Copping - 25%
Village Roadshow - 50%
The production side would have veto on production decisions, the distribution side would have a veto on distribution decisions, and all would have a say in what projects they would do. Initially Alan Finney represented Roadshow on the Hexagon board.

In the 1970s Hexagon were the most successful filmmaking company in Australia. They made a profit of $940,000 from Alvin Purple. Bilcock and Copping left Hexagon prior to making Eliza Fraser.

Select Credits
Alvin Purple (1973)
Inside Alvin Purple (1973) (TV)
Alvin Rides Again (1974)
Petersen (1974)
Australia After Dark (1975)
The Love Epidemic (1975)
End Play (1975)
Eliza Fraser (1975)
High Rolling (1977)
The Last of the Knucklemen (1979)

See also

List of companies of Australia
List of film production companies
List of television production companies

References

External links
Hexagon Productions at IMDb
Hexagon Productions at Australian Screen Online
Hexagon Productions at National Film and Sound Archive

Mass media companies established in 1972
Film production companies of Australia